Kiss of Death is the second album by American rapper Jadakiss. It is the follow-up to his 2001 Platinum-RIAA selling debut album Kiss tha Game Goodbye. The album was released in the US on the June 22, 2004 and debuted at number one on both the Billboard 200 and the Top R&B/Hip-Hop Albums charts.

Singles
The album's singles charted successfully. The singles include "Why" featuring Anthony Hamilton) which peaked at number 11 on the US Billboard Hot 100 and number 4 on the Billboard Hot R&B/Hip-Hop Songs chart and "U Make Me Wanna" featuring Mariah Carey) which peaked at number 21 on the US Billboard Hot 100 and number 8 on the Billboard Hot R&B/Hip-Hop Songs chart.

Commercial performance
The album debuted at number one on the US Billboard 200 selling 246,000 copies in its first week. It was certified Gold by the Recording Industry Association of America (RIAA) for sales of over 500,000 copies in the United States a week later. In the UK, the album debuted at number 65 on the UK Albums Chart.

Track listing

Notes
 signifies an additional producer.

Charts

Weekly charts

Year-end charts

Certifications

References

External links
 

2004 albums
Jadakiss albums
Interscope Records albums
Albums produced by the Neptunes
Albums produced by Scott Storch
Albums produced by Swizz Beatz
Albums produced by DJ Green Lantern
Albums produced by the Alchemist (musician)
Albums produced by Havoc (musician)
Albums produced by Kanye West
Albums produced by Eminem
Albums produced by JellyRoll
Ruff Ryders Entertainment albums
Albums produced by Neo da Matrix